Babupali is a village in the state of Odisha, in the Subarnapur district.

Geography
Babupali is located at .It has an average elevation of 383 metres (800 feet) above sea level.

Religious places
Religious places of Hindu religion

There are five temples in Babupali. Each and every Pada has one or more temples.
Following are some of the Most Popular and important temples of Babupali Village.
 Maa Samaleswari Temple (Samalei Gudi). Dedicated to Maa Samalei.
 Gopaljee Temple - Oldest temple of Babupali  village dedicated to Lord Krishna.
 Jagannath Temple - Dedicated to Lord Jagannath
 Durga Temple - Dedicated to Lord Durga.
 Ram Temple - It is dedicated to Lord Ram, Seeta, Laxman and Hanuman.

References

Villages in Subarnapur district